Nicholas Charles Rassas (born January 13, 1944) is a former Professional Football for The Atlanta Falcons from 1966 to 1968. He is also notable for Playing College Football at Notre Dame where he played for Ara Parseghian from 1963 to 1965. 
Rassas was a main Underdog in a Jim Dent book Resurrection:The Miracle Season that saved Notre Dame about the 1964 Notre Dame Fighting Irish football team.

See also 
 List of NCAA major college yearly punt and kickoff return leaders

1944 births
Living people
All-American college football players
American football safeties
Atlanta Falcons players
Notre Dame Fighting Irish football players
Players of American football from Baltimore